The First 10 Explosive Years Volume 2 is a 2001 compilation album by British rock band Atomic Rooster.

Whilst being a very good compilation for fans of the band, it consists entirely of unlicensed tracks, whose copyright is owned by Sanctuary (who purchased the B&C and Dawn catalogues), EMI and Polydor Records.

It has been reissued and repackaged at least once: in 2004, it was teamed with The First Ten Explosive Years [Volume 1] and released on the Recall Records label (a subsidiary of Snapper Music) as a double CD titled Tomorrow Night.

Track listing (with spelling and title corrections)
"Do You Know Who's Looking for You" 3:06
"End of the Day" 3:28
"Watch Out!" 4: 04
"Don't Lose Your Mind" 3:34
"VUG" 5:01
"She's My Woman" 3:13
"In the Shadows" 6:55
"Shabooloo" aka "Before Tomorrow" 5:49
"Friday the 13th" 3:30 - US version
"Broken Window" 3:49
"Backward" 0:17 - actually separately-indexed intro to "Nobody Else"; both featured on Death Walks Behind You 1970
"Nobody Else" 4:44
"He Did it Again" 4:03
"A Spoonful of Bromide Helps the Pulse Rate Go Down" 4:38
"I Can't Stand It" aka "I Don’t Need You Anymore" 3:49
"The Rock" 4:23
"Where's the Show?" 3:54
"Gershatzer" 8:02

Atomic Rooster compilation albums
Angel Air albums
2001 compilation albums